A compressor is a mechanical device that increases the pressure of a gas by reducing its volume. 

Compressor may also refer to:

 A device that performs Compression (disambiguation)
 Compressor (audio signal processor), for dynamic range compression
 Compressor (software), a video and audio media compression and encoding application

See also

 Compression (disambiguation)
 Compaction (disambiguation)
 Decompression (disambiguation)
 Expansion (disambiguation)
 Kompressor (disambiguation) 
 Compressor Hot Springs, a place in California, U.S.
 Supercharger
 Turbocharger